Philemon Thomas Herbert (November 1, 1825 – July 23, 1864) was an American politician best known for killing a waiter for refusing to serve him breakfast. He served as the Democratic U.S. Representative from California. He represented the California Second District in the 34th Congress from 1855 to 1857.

Early life
Herbert was born on November 1, 1825, in Pine Apple, Alabama.

Career
Herbert joined the Democratic Party. He served two terms in the California State Assembly, representing Mariposa County, California. From 1855 to 1857, he represented California's Second District in the  34th Congress  of the United States House of Representatives.

In 1856, when he was refused breakfast service at Willard's Hotel in Washington because it was too late in the morning, he got into a quarrel with the Irish headwaiter, and shot and killed him. He was acquitted of manslaughter by a sympathetic jury, but abandoned his Congressional career.

In 1859, Herbert moved to El Paso, Texas, where he practiced law.

When the Civil War broke out in 1861, he joined the Confederate Army. He rose to the rank of lieutenant colonel, and commanded the Arizona Cavalry and the 7th Texas Cavalry Regiment.  He was wounded at the Battle of Mansfield on April 8, 1864.

Death
Herbert died of his wounds on July 23, 1864. He was buried at Evergreen Cemetery in Kingston, Louisiana.

References

Other sources 
The New York Times, July 14, 1856.

External links

1825 births
1864 deaths
Democratic Party members of the United States House of Representatives from California
Democratic Party members of the California State Assembly
Confederate States Army officers
People from Wilcox County, Alabama
People from Mariposa County, California
People from El Paso, Texas
People of Texas in the American Civil War
19th-century American politicians
United States politicians killed during the Civil War
Military personnel from Texas